John the Good may refer to:

 John the Good (bishop of Milan), or John Bono, bishop of Milan in the 7th-century
 John I of Portugal  (1357 – 1433), King of Portugal and the Algarve
 John II of France (1319 – 1364), King of France
 Johann II, Prince of Liechtenstein (1840 – 1929), Prince of Liechtenstein
 John II Komnenos (1087 – 1143), Emperor of the Byzantine Empire